Jean-Bruno Gassies (1786–1832), a French historical and genre painter, was born at Bordeaux.

He studied under Vincent and Pierre Lacour, and died in Paris in 1832. He chiefly executed historical subjects from the Old and New Testaments, or from French history; but the pictures exhibited by him embrace a great variety of subjects — historical, poetical, and allegorical — landscapes, marine views, interiors of churches, and striking scenes on the coasts of England and France.

Among his works are:

Hagar and Ishmael. 1811. (Brussels Gallery)
Virgil reading his Aeneid to Augustus. 1814.
Horace at the Tomb of Virgil. 1817.
Portrait of Louis XVIII. 1819. (Bordeaux Museum)
The Communion of St. Louis. 1819.
The Clemency of Louis XII. 1824. (Versailles Gallery)
View of the Church of Boulogne. 1826.
A Bivouac of the National Guard. 1831.

References

 

1786 births
1832 deaths
19th-century French painters
French male painters
Artists from Bordeaux
19th-century French male artists
18th-century French male artists